Wonderfest is a nonprofit California corporation dedicated to informal science education.

Wonderfest achieved corporate independence in September 2011.  During the preceding fourteen years, Wonderfest was an educational project of, first, San Francisco University High School, then, The Branson School.  From 1998 to 2010, Wonderfest produced an annual science festival—the first such community-wide event in the United States—that presented a series of expert dialogues on topics of scientific controversy.  The topics were varied, covering astronomy, biology, psychology, physics, etc.  In 2011, this festival was supplanted by the Bay Area Science Festival, headquartered at the University of California, San Francisco.

Wonderfest, subtitled "The Bay Area Beacon of Science," is dedicated to the memory of Carl Sagan.  From 2002 through 2010, and 2015-present, Wonderfest awarded the $5000 Carl Sagan Prize for Science Popularization.

Wonderfest's founding director is Tucker Hiatt, physics teacher and former Stanford Visiting Scholar. Wonderfest's board of directors now guides its development:

 Jacob Bien -- Associate Professor of Statistics, University of Southern California
 Jack Conte -- Musician, videographer, & Patreon CEO
 Alexander Eccles -- Musician & Composer
 Alex Filippenko -- Professor of Astronomy, University of California, Berkeley
 Maribel Fraser -- Emeritus Director of Information Technology, AT&T
 Juliana Gallin -- Author and creator of Ask a Scientist
 Howard Rheingold -- Author and Educator
 Kendra Kramlich -- Financial Planner & Science Enthusiast
 Robert Strong -- Comedy Magician, San Francisco
 Eric Yao -- Bioinformatician, Wonderfest Technical Director & Board Chair

Emeritus Board Members
 Eugenie Scott, Founding Director, National Center for Science Education
 Richard Zare, Professor of Chemistry, Stanford University

References 

Science events
Recurring events established in 1998
1998 establishments in California